Lehman John "Leo" Tobin (November 25, 1890 – November 29, 1952) was an American football player who played one season for the Akron Pros. He played with his brother Elgie Tobin in 1921, his only season.

Leo Tobin was born on November 25, 1890 in Roscoe, Pennsylvania. He went to high school at California (PA) and to college at Grove City. According to pro football archives, he played in one game in the Akron Pros' championship in 1920, but he was not listed on their roster in other sources. In 1921, he played in between 9 and 12 games. He was 5 feet, 9 inches tall, and weighed 220 pounds. His only statistic was one extra point scored. His brother Elgie Tobin was the head coach of the Pros in 1920 and 21. Tobin died on November 29, 1952 at the age of 62, it was 5 days after his 62nd birthday.

References

1890 births
1952 deaths
Grove City Wolverines football players
Akron Pros players
Players of American football from Pennsylvania
People from Washington County, Pennsylvania